Salvia azurea, the azure blue sage, azure sage, blue sage or prairie sage, is a herbaceous perennial in the genus Salvia that is native to Central and Eastern North America.

Description

There are no basal leaves.

Two varieties are known, Salvia azurea var. azurea (azure sage) and Salvia azurea var. grandiflora (Pitcher sage).

The stems of wild S. azurea tend to be long and unbranched, causing them to flop under the weight of their flowers. When grown in cultivation, the stems of S. azurea are sometimes cut back early in the growing season to encourage branching and slow the vertical growth of the plant to prevent lodging.

Distribution and habitat
S. azurea is found from Utah east to Connecticut and from Minnesota south to Florida. S. azurea var. azurea tends to be found in the eastern and southeastern portion of this range, while S. azurea var. grandiflora is found in the west and northwest.  In some states within its native range, it has become especially rare, such as in Illinois, where it is listed as a threatened species.

Throughout its range, it is found growing wild on roadsides, glades, prairies, savannas, fields and pastures. S. azurea prefers dry, sunny conditions in a variety of soils, including clay, gravel, and loam. In wetter conditions, the plant will still grow and bloom, but tends to lodge.

Varieties 

 Salvia azurea var. azurea - azure sage
 Salvia azurea var. grandiflora - Pitcher sage
 Salvia azurea var. grandiflora 'Nekan' - seed selection released in 1977 by Manhattan Plant Materials Center of Manhattan, Kansas, and Nebraska Agriculture Experiment Station in Lincoln, Nebraska. Selected for better performance and more uniform plant growth.

References

External links

azurea
Flora of Northeastern Mexico
Flora of the United States
Flora of the North-Central United States
Flora of the Southeastern United States
Flora of Colorado
Flora of Florida
Flora of New Mexico
Flora of New York (state)
Flora of Utah
Flora without expected TNC conservation status